Donald Duck: The Complete Sunday Comics is a series of hardcover books collecting the complete run of Disney's Donald Duck Sunday newspaper comic strip. Drawn by the American comic artist Al Taliaferro, it starts off with the first of Donald Duck's own Sunday strip page from 10 December 1939, after he had first been introduced in the successful Silly Symphony Sunday strip feature as well as in his own daily newspaper strip since 1938. The publisher behind the project is IDW Publishing and their imprint (subdivision), The Library of American Comics. The first book of the series was released in March 2016.

Format
The hardcover books have a sewn binding, sewn linen bookmark and come with a dust jacket. The books measure 12 in × 8.5 in, approximately 305 mm × 216 mm, and are oriented in a landscape view to be able to fit each comic strip as close to their original published size as possible, given the set surface area. Each page accommodates one Sunday strip page.

The print is in full color throughout the book, the Sunday strips were published in full color originally and for these archival volumes the coloring has been recolored and remastered by Digikore Studios for the best possible reproduction. Each volume of the series have about 170 pages and contain around 160 full-color Sunday strips (the equivalent to a little more than three years of an original Sunday newspaper run) as for supplementary material there are introductions included just like in the Donald Duck: The Complete Daily Newspaper Comics from the same publisher. The introduction for the Sunday collection is written by Alberto Becattini.

Volumes of the series are sold separately and have a suggested retail price set by the publisher at $49.99, ten dollars more expensive each compared to a volume of Donald Duck: The Complete Daily Newspaper Comics. According to the publisher, the price increase is due to the restoration and recoloring necessary for the Sunday strips, something that was not needed for the black-and-white daily strips. The publication of the series was apparently discontinued, as no further volumes were published after the two initial ones in 2016.

Volumes

Upcoming volumes

In April 2018, it was announced that the series is on hold due to the publisher prioritizing work on their companion project Donald Duck: The Complete Daily Newspaper Comics.

See also
Donald Duck: The Complete Daily Newspaper Comics
Silly Symphonies: The Complete Disney Classics
Walt Disney's Mickey Mouse

References

External links 

 Donald Duck - The Complete Sunday Comics at the INDUCKS
 Donald Duck'' Publisher's website - IDW Publishing - The Library of American Comics
 Inside look of Donald Duck - The Sunday Newspaper Comics Vol. 1 Library of American Comics' YouTube channel
 Inside look of Donald Duck - The Sunday Newspaper Comics Vol. 2 Library of American Comics' YouTube channel
 Preview - Donald Duck - The Sunday Newspaper Comics Vol. 1 at Issuu
 Preview - Donald Duck - The Sunday Newspaper Comics Vol. 2 at Issuu
 DuckTales: The Comic That Inspired The Series Den of Geek. 7th Nov, 2017 

The Library of American Comics publications
Comic strip collection books
Disney comic strips
Disney comics titles
Donald Duck comics
Donald Duck